John Gilpin Heyburn II (November 12, 1948 – April 29, 2015) was a United States district judge of the United States District Court for the Western District of Kentucky. Heyburn served as the Chief Judge of the Court between 2001 and 2008.

Early life and education

Heyburn was born in Boston, Massachusetts and raised in Louisville, Kentucky. His father and grandfather were both attorneys. Heyburn graduated from Harvard University with his Artium Baccalaureus degree in 1970 where he also lettered in cross-country and track, completed several Boston Marathons, and was a member of the Owl Club. He earned his Juris Doctor from the University of Kentucky College of Law in 1976 and was a member of its National Moot Court Team.

Legal career

Heyburn spent his entire pre-judicial legal career as a private practice attorney with the Louisville based law firm of Brown, Todd and Heyburn (now Frost Brown Todd) from 1976 to 1992. His practice focused on civil litigation within the construction industry. He also served as Special Counsel for then-Jefferson County Judge/Executive Mitch McConnell. Also, Heyburn served in the United States Army Reserve from 1970 to 1976.

Federal judicial career

On the recommendation of Senator Mitch McConnell, Heyburn was nominated by President George H. W. Bush on March 20, 1992 to a seat vacated by Thomas A. Ballantine Jr. as Ballantine took senior status. Heyburn was confirmed by the United States Senate on August 12, 1992 on a Senate vote and received commission on August 17, 1992. He served as Chief Judge from 2001 to 2008. He took senior status on April 1, 2014. He served in that capacity until his death from liver cancer on April 29, 2015 at the age of 66, in Louisville.

In 1994, Chief Justice Rehnquist appointed Heyburn to serve on the Budget Committee of the Judicial Conference of the United States. In January 1997, Heyburn was appointed Chair of the Budget Committee and served in that capacity until December 2004. In that role Heyburn led the development of the appropriations request for the federal judiciary. He testified many times before various House and Senate committees on budget issues. He consulted with the Republic of Ireland judiciary during the reform of their justice system.

In June 2007, Chief Justice Roberts appointed Heyburn as Chair of the Judicial Panel on Multidistrict Litigation. The Panel decides whether cases in districts around the nation including overlapping nationwide or statewide class actions, should be centralized in a single judicial district for pretrial purposes.

Heyburn spoke throughout the country on the congressional budget process, the independent judiciary and the role of the Panel on Multidistrict Litigation in complex litigation.

Notable cases

Heyburn presided over Maker's Mark v. Diageo North America, et al., 703 F. Supp. 2d 671 (W.D. Ky. 2010). Heyburn's ruling in that case was upheld on appeal to the Sixth Circuit; the appellate decision, Maker's Mark, 679 F.3d 410 (2012), written by Judge Boyce F. Martin, Jr., began: "All bourbon is whiskey, but not all whiskey is bourbon." It is recognized as one of the most thoughtful judicial histories of bourbon and American spirits ever printed.

On February 11, 2014, Heyburn ruled in Bourke v. Beshear that the Commonwealth of Kentucky must recognize same-sex marriages performed in states where those unions are legal.

On July 1, 2014, Heyburn ruled again in favor of same sex marriage, declaring that same-sex couples have a right to marry in Kentucky. He wrote "In America, even sincere and long-hold religious beliefs do not trump the constitutional rights of those who happen to have been out-voted", in response to arguments put forth by attorney Leigh Latherow, who was hired by Gov. Steve Beshear to defend the ban. The argument put forth by the Ashland attorney was solely justified by the assertion that traditional marriages contribute to a more stable birth rate, which in turn bolsters the state's economic health. Heyburn was quoted, "These arguments are not those of serious people."

References

External links
 FJC Bio
 Judge Heyburn's homepage
 Website of the United States District Court for the Western District of Kentucky
 Website of the Judicial Panel on Multidistrict Litigation

1948 births
2015 deaths
Harvard Crimson men's track and field athletes
Judges of the United States District Court for the Western District of Kentucky
United States district court judges appointed by George H. W. Bush
20th-century American judges
University of Kentucky College of Law alumni
Lawyers from Boston
Lawyers from Louisville, Kentucky
Harvard Crimson men's cross country runners